The Velopark is a motorsport centre opened in 2008, located in the city of Nova Santa Rita, Rio Grande do Sul, Brazil. It was designed to have various layouts so that it could accommodate a wide variety of vehicles, such as karts, dragsters, and formula and touring cars.

The Velopark consists of a main racecourse, a straight for dragsters, and three kart tracks including an oval, the only oval made for karts in South America.

Racecourse

Its first official race was held in May 2010 for Stock Car Brasil. It was won by Ricardo Maurício.
This track has 9 curves and 3 sectors with 2 DRS zones. The circuit also hosted the Brazilian Formula Three Championship.

Lap records

The official fastest lap records at the Velopark are listed as:

References

External links
 
 Map and circuit history at RacingCircuits.info

Velopark
Sports venues in Rio Grande do Sul